

Harald von Hirschfeld (10 July 1912 – 18 January 1945) was a war criminal and general in the Wehrmacht of Nazi Germany who commanded the 78. Volksgrenadier-Division during World War II. He was a recipient of the  Knight's Cross of the Iron Cross with Oak Leaves.

Hirschfeld, the son of a Mecklenburg merchant, was largely educated and trained abroad, in South America, Spain, London, and Paris and was fluent in Italian and Spanish. He joined the Wehrmacht in 1935 and served most of his career in the 1st Mountain Division (1. Gebirgs-Division): in 1938 he was the Adjutant of the 2nd battalion; in August 1940, he took command of the 7th company; in August 1942 he led the 2nd company and in October 1943 he served as the commander of the 98th Mountain Regiment.

In September 1943, as a colonel in the 1st Mountain Division, he played a major role in the massacre of the Acqui Division,  the murder of 5,155 Italian prisoners of war of the 33 Mountain Infantry Division Acqui in Cephalonia.

On 15 January 1945, he was promoted to Generalmajor. On that day he was officially put in command of the 78th Sturm Division, which he had unofficially led since 26 September 1944. He was the Wehrmacht's youngest general officer.  He was severely wounded during the Battle of Dukla Pass and died en route to the field hospital on 18 January 1945. He was posthumously promoted to lieutenant general on 10 February 1945. Hirschfeld was married to Sylvinia von Dönhoff, who later married the former fighter pilot Adolf Galland.

Awards and decorations
 Anschluss Medal (8 November 1938)
 Iron Cross (1939)  2nd Class (1 November 1939) & 1st Class (28 June 1941)
 Wound Badge (1939)  Black (23 July 1941), Silver (23 September 1941) & Gold (2 October 1941)
 Infantry Assault Badge (25 July 1941)
 Order of the Crown (Romania)  with Swords on Ribbon 5th Class (1 November 1941)
 Eastern Front Medal (1 August 1942)
 Knight's Cross of the Iron Cross with Oak Leaves
 Knight's Cross on 15 November 1941 as Oberleutnant and chief of the 7./Gebirgsjäger-Regiment 98
 Oak Leaves on 23 December 1942 as Hauptmann and leader of the 11./Gebirgsjäger-Regiment 98

References

Citations

Bibliography

 
 
 

1912 births
1945 deaths
Military personnel from Weimar
Lieutenant generals of the German Army (Wehrmacht)
German mass murderers
Gebirgsjäger of World War II
People from Saxe-Weimar-Eisenach
Recipients of the Knight's Cross of the Iron Cross with Oak Leaves
German Army personnel killed in World War II
Perpetrators of World War II prisoner of war massacres
Nazi war criminals